Valença Airport  is the airport serving Valença, Brazil and the holiday area around Morro de São Paulo, in the municipality of Cairu.

History
The airport was opened in 1948 and renovated in 2000.

Airlines and destinations
No scheduled flights operate at this airport.

Access

See also

List of airports in Brazil

References

External links

Airports in Bahia